Collodictyonidae (also Diphylleidae) is a group of aquatic, unicellular eukaryotic organisms with two to four terminal flagella. They feed by phagocytosis, ingesting other unicellular organisms like algae and bacteria. The most remarkable fact of this clade is its uncertain position in the tree of life.

Recent molecular analyses place Collodictyonids (e.g. Collodictyon) in a clade also containing Rigifilida and Mantamonadidae. This clade has been named CRuMs and is sister to Amorphea.

Phylogeny

Taxonomy
 Class Diphyllatea Cavalier-Smith 2003 [Anisomonadea; Diphyllatia Cavalier-Smith 2003]
 Order Diphylleida Cavalier-Smith 1993 [Collodictyonida] 
 Family Sulcomonadidae Cavalier-Smith 2012
 Genus Sulcomonas Brugerolle 2006
 Species S. lacustris Brugerolle 2006
 Family Diphylleidae Cavalier-Smith 1993 [Collodictyonidae Brugerolle et al. 2002]
 Genus Diphylleia Massart 1920 non Michaux 1803 [Aulacomonas Skuja 1939]
 Species D. rotans Massart 1920 [Aulacomonas submarina Skuja 1939]
 Genus Collodictyon Carter 1865
 Species C. hongkongense Skvortzov 1968
 Species C. indicum Iyengar 1981
 Species C. oxycareni Franchini 1922
 Species C. sparsevacuolatum Skuja 1956
 Species C. triciliatum Carter 1865

References 

Podiata families